Amy Birnbaum (born April 14, 1975) is an American voice actress, who works on the properties of 4Kids Entertainment.

Career
She has done many voiceovers for cartoons, mainly dubbing for English versions of anime. Her works can be found in anime dubs such as Pokémon, Yu-Gi-Oh!, Kirby: Right Back at Ya!, Magical DoReMi, and G.I. Joe: Sigma 6. Overall, Birnbaum is best known for voicing Téa Gardner in Yu-Gi-Oh!, and Charmy Bee in the Sonic the Hedgehog video game series from 2005 to 2009 starting with Sonic X.

Music
Birnbaum sang with The Amalgamates at Tufts University and won critical acclaim for her solo work on their recordings.

Personal life
Birnbaum is married and has two children. She currently works at Cartoon Network Studios as a Senior Manager.

Filmography

Film and Television

Anime

Video games

References

External links
 Official website
 
 

Living people
American video game actresses
American voice actresses
Place of birth missing (living people)
1975 births
21st-century American women